Hajji Fattah-e Beg (also Romanized as Hājjī Fattāh-e Beg) is a village in Fathabad Rural District, in the Central District of Qasr-e Shirin County, Kermanshah Province, Iran. At the 2006 census, its population was 155, in 39 families.

References 

Populated places in Qasr-e Shirin County